The Miss International Belgium (Known as Miss Belgium International) is a beauty pageant which selects Miss Belgium to the Miss International pageant.

History
Belgium was debuted at the Miss International beauty pageant in 1960 by Miss Belgium contest. In 1987 Muriel Jane Georges Rens had been successful placed as the 1st Runner-up at the Miss International 1987 in Tokyo, Japan where Laurie Simpson of Puerto Rico won the title. Between 1997 and 2007 Belgium did not exist at the pageant. In 2008 Miss Belgium Organization signed up to be National franchise holder of Miss International in Belgium again but it was run until 2010 by runner-up of Miss Belgium.

In 2012 Belgium comes from Katia Maes directorship in Miss International history. The winner of Miss International Belgium may come at the Miss International beauty pageant which mostly happens in Japan. The reigning title is expected to serve as Ambassador of Peace in Belgium.

Titleholders

International pageants

Miss International Belgium
Color key

References

External links
Official Page of Miss Belgium International

Beauty pageants in Belgium
Belgian awards